L. maculata may refer to:

 Labrichthys maculata, a wrasse native to the coast of southern Australia
 Lambis maculata, a true conch
 Leptodeira maculata, a cat-eyed snake
 Leucophenga maculata, a fruit fly
 Lipocarpha maculata, a halfchaff sedge
 Lissoeme maculata, a longhorn beetle
 Lophocampa maculata, a Northern American moth
 Luidia maculata, a Pacific starfish
 Lutica maculata, a zodariid spider
 Lysiosquillina maculata, a mantis shrimp

Synonyms 
 Ledebouria maculata, a synonym for Drimiopsis maculata, a plant species